AAMD may refer to:

 American Academy of Medical Directors, former name of the American Association for Physician Leadership
 American Association on Mental Deficiency, a former name of the American Association on Intellectual and Developmental Disabilities
 Association of Art Museum Directors, organization of art museum directors

See also
AMD (disambiguation)